This is a list of flag bearers who have represented Vanuatu at the Olympics.

Flag bearers carry the national flag of their country at the opening ceremony of the Olympic Games.

See also
Vanuatu at the Olympics

References

Vanuatu at the Olympics
Vanuatu
Olympic flagbearers